The Dialogue of the Burkinabé Opposition (COB) was a political alliance in Burkina Faso (former Upper Volta. 
It was founded in January 2002 by the following political parties:

Convergence for Social Democracy (CSD)
Sankarist Pan-African Convention (CPS)
Patriotic Front for Change (FPC)
Group of Patriotic Democrats (GDP)
African Independence Party (PAI)
National Rebirth Party (PAREN)
Party for Democracy and Socialism (PDS)
Party of the Independent Forces for Development (PFID)
Republican National Party / Just Way (PNR/JV)
Union for Rebirth / Sankarist Movement (UNIR/MS)
National Union for Democracy and Development (UNDD)
Alliance for Democracy and Federation-African Democratic Rally (ADF-RDA)
Union of Independent Democrats and Progressives (UDPI)
National Convention of Progressive Democrats (CNDP)

In December 2004 the COB was replaced by Change 2005.

Defunct political party alliances in Burkina Faso